Simone  is a 1926 French silent drama film directed by Donatien and starring Lucienne Legrand, Jeanne Kervich and Jean Dehelly. It is based on a play by 
Eugène Brieux, which had previously been turned into a 1918 silent film of the same name.

Cast
 Lucienne Legrand as Simone de Sergeac 
 Jeanne Kervich as Hermance  
 Jean Dehelly as Michel Mignier 
 Claude France as Mme de Sergeac  
 Donatien as M. de Sergeac  
 Maxime Desjardins as M. de Lorcy  
 Georges de La Noë as Le père de Michel  
 Josseline Gaël as Simone enfant  
 Jean Lorette as M. de Naugeac  
 Émilien Richard as L'avocat  
 Lionel Salem as Le notaire

References

Bibliography
 Goble, Alan. The Complete Index to Literary Sources in Film. Walter de Gruyter, 1999.

External links 
 

1926 films
French drama films
1926 drama films
French silent films
Remakes of French films
French films based on plays
French black-and-white films
Films directed by Émile-Bernard Donatien
Silent drama films
1920s French films
1920s French-language films